The 2021 BAL season, also known as BAL Season 1, was the inaugural season of the Basketball Africa League (BAL). Established as a joint effort between the National Basketball Association (NBA) and FIBA, the BAL is the highest tier continental league of Africa, replacing the FIBA Africa Basketball League. Due to the COVID-19 pandemic, the BAL held its inaugural season one year later as planned, with the season beginning in 2021. Initially the league planned to play in six venues in six countries; however, due to the pandemic the season was held in a bio-secure bubble in Kigali, Rwanda. The season began on 16 May 2021 and ended on 30 May 2021.

The qualifying rounds for the season were held from 16 October to 21 December 2019, with national champion of each African country has the opportunity to qualify through the qualifying rounds. Meanwhile, six national champions directly qualified for the regular season to make up a total of twelve teams divided over four groups.

Zamalek won the first-ever BAL championship after beating US Monastir in the finals and going undefeated over the season.

Overview
In August 2019, the seven host cities for the BAL season were announced. Additionally, it was revealed that the inaugural BAL Final Four would be played in the Kigali Arena in Kigali, Rwanda. BAL president Amadou Gallo Fall, later announced at the NBA All-Star 2020 Africa Luncheon in Chicago, that the season was planned to tip off on 13 March 2020. On 20 February 2020, it was announced that the twelve teams were drawn in two conferences named the Sahara and Nile Conferences.

Effects of the COVID-19 pandemic
On 3 March 2020, the BAL announced it was postponing its inaugural season due to the COVID-19 pandemic. The decision was made following recommendations of the Senegalese government.

In November, the start of the inaugural season was delayed for a second time and the new season was moved to a later to be announced date in 2021. In March it was announced the league would commence in May 2021. The complete event was re-scheduled to be held in the Kigali Arena and the regular season changed its format from two groups to three groups of four. All twelve teams were hosted in a bio-secure bubble in which all players were regularly tested for COVID-19. All games were broadcast live by ESPN Africa.

Qualification
The twelve teams for the inaugural BAL season had to qualify in their domestic competitions to be able to play in the league, similar to other FIBA-organised competitions. Six teams qualified directly as their national champions while an additional six teams qualified through regional qualifying tournaments.

Direct qualification
FIBA announced that the national champions of six member associations would be directly qualified for the regular season. These teams are from countries which are also hosts cities for the regular season, except for Final Four host Rwanda. On 23 October 2019, AS Douanes won the Senegalese national championship, becoming the first club to qualify.

Qualifying tournaments

Each of the FIBA Africa member associations was able to register one team from its country to participate in the qualifying tournaments. A total of 31 teams played in the first round, which was divided into six groups in six different host cities. The qualification tournaments started on 16 October and will end 21 December 2019.

Teams

Qualified teams

Personnel and sponsorship

Foreign players
In line with league rules, each BAL team was allowed to have four foreign players on its roster, including only two non-African players.

Venues

On 1 August 2019, the NBA announced the seven host cities for the regular season. Six cities in six countries would host the regular season games, with three assigned to each conference. The Kigali Arena in Kigali, Rwanda was announced as venue for the inaugural Final Four. Because of the COVID-19 pandemic outbreak, it was later decided that the entire event was to be played at the Kigali Arena.

Schedule

Qualifying tournaments

In the qualifying rounds, 32 teams from 32 countries participated in the West and East Division. The first round began 15 October and ended 3 November 2019, with sixteen teams advancing to the second round. The second-round games began 26 November and will end 22 December 2019, with six teams qualifying for the regular season.

Rosters

Transactions

Group phase

The group phase began on 16 May 2021 and ended on 24 May 2021. Initially, it was planned that in the regular season, the twelve teams would play in two Conferences with six teams each. Each team would play five games, one against each opponent, inside its conference. The top three teams from each conference would advance to the Super 6. The regular season would be played in six arenas divided over the African continent.

The format was changed to a group phase as a result of the COVID-19 pandemic, which was completely played at the Kigali Arena. In three groups of four each team plays the other one time and the first, second and best third-placed teams advance to the playoffs.

Group A

Group B

Group C

Ranking of third-placed teams

Playoffs

All eight qualified teams from the group stage were ranked and seeded to determine the match-ups. The play-offs games were played in a single-elimination format. The playoffs began on 26 May and ended on 30 May 2021 with the 2021 BAL Finals.

Bracket

Final standings

Awards
Most Valuable Player:  Walter Hodge (Zamalek)
Defensive Player of the Year:  Anas Mahmoud (Zamalek)
Sportsmanship Award:  Makrem Ben Romdhane (US Monastir)
Ubuntu Award:  Hicham Benayad-Cherif (GS Pétroliers)
Scoring Champion:  Terrell Stoglin (AS Salé)
All-BAL First Team:
 Omar Abada (US Monastir)
 Walter Hodge (Zamalek)
 Wael Arakji (US Monastir)
 Makrem Ben Romdhane (US Monastir)
 Anas Mahmoud (Zamalek)

Statistics
The following were the statistical leaders in 2021 BAL season.

Individual statistic leaders

Individual game highs

Team statistic leaders

Controversies
The BAL has faced criticism by The Guardian over its close ties with the Rwandan government in organising the league, using the league as a vehicle for sportswashing by Rwandan President Paul Kagame, pointing to ongoing repression and human rights abuses under his regime.

On May 10, 2021, American rapper J. Cole signed a contract with the Rwanda-based Patriots. In three games with the team, he scored five points, had three assists and five rebounds in 45 minutes of gameplay. Terrell Stoglin of AS Salé states about the signing: "For a guy who has so much money and has another career to just come here and average, like, one point a game and still get glorified is very disrespectful to the game. It's disrespectful to the ones who sacrificed their whole lives for this."

References

2021 in African basketball
2020 in African basketball
2019–20 in basketball leagues
2020–21 in basketball leagues
Basketball Africa League seasons
Basketball Africa League, 2020